is a 1968 Japanese film directed by Kinji Fukasaku.  The film is based on a play by Yukio Mishima which in turn is based on a novel by Rampo Edogawa. The play had previously been adapted to film in 1962 by director Umetsugu Inoue.

Plot
Shobei Iwase is a jeweler whose daughter Sanae works as a hostess at a club. Mrs. Midorikawa visits Sanae and introduces her to Yamakawa, young businessman from Tokyo. When they visit his room to look at a wedding doll, he chloroforms Sanae and stuffs her into a trunk.

Detective Akechi explains that Yamakawa was actually a depressed man named Junichi Amamiya who was convinced by Black Lizard to kidnap Sanae. Suspecting this, Akechi sends his men to follow Amamiya and he successfully recovers Sanae. Akechi explains that Mrs. Midorikawa is actually Black Lizard in disguise. Black Lizard dresses in men's clothing to escape the hotel unnoticed.

Sanae is told to stay in her room at her father's house, but his housekeeper Hina works to kidnap her along with another worker. Iwase's guard Matobe attempts to intervene but they cut off his hand, leaving blood all over Iwase's new sofa. Iwase demands the removal of the sofa, which his employees arrange while sneaking out Sanae in a hidden compartment underneath its seat.

Black Lizard sends a note promising the return of Sanae in exchange for the Star of Egypt, a South African gem worth 120 million yen that is Iwase's prized possession. Iwase brings the gem to Black Lizard at New Shinonome pier at noon on August 4 as requested and Black Lizard lies that Sanae will be returned to him that night.

Black Lizard takes Sanae on a ship to a private island but hears Akechi speaking from the e sofa's hidden compartment so Black Lizard thrusts a sword through it and orders the sofa thrown overboard. Akechi was actually hiding in the closet and appears before Black Lizard disguised as the old sailor Matsukichi.

On the island, Black Lizard presents her collection of human bodies perfectly preserved as statues. Junichi Amamiya attempts to help Sanae escape but is caught and thrown in a cell with her, where she confesses that she is a woman named Yoko Sakurayana hired to be Sanae's double and he confesses that he got caught on purpose in order to be turned into one of Black Lizard's dolls to stay with her and be caressed by her forever. Junichi and Yoko fall in love.

Black Lizard reads a newspaper article that Sanae has already been returned to her father and is infuriated. Akechi summons the police and reveals himself to Black Lizard. He frees Junichi and Yoko and lets them leave to live their life together. Hina attempts to throw a poisonous snake at Akechi but Black Lizard stops her by impaling her with a sword before running to her room. Akechi reveals that Black Lizard killed the real Matsukichi in the sofa compartment and Black Lizard reveals that she has consumed poison, whereupon she dies.

Cast
Akihiro Maruyama as "Black Lizard", disguised as Mrs. Midorikawa
Isao Kimura as Detective Kogorō Akechi
Kikko Matsuoka as Sanae Iwase
Junya Usami as Shobei Iwase
Yûsuke Kawazu as Junichi Amamiya
Kō Nishimura as Private Detective Keiji Matoba
Toshiko Kobayashi as Hina
Sonosuke Oda as Harada
Kinji Hattori as Toyama
Kōichi Satō as Ohkawa
Jun Katō as Sakai
Ryūji Funakoshi as Kōzu
Mitsuko Takara as Show Dancer
Tetsurō Tamba as Kuroki
Yukio Mishima as a taxidermic Japanese human specimen

Release
Black Lizard was released in Japan in August 1968. Fukasaku stated the film was very popular and successful on its initial release. He added that Shochiku had offered him a chance to direct a follow-up that  would also star Maruyama.

In the United States, it was theatrically released by Shochiku Films of America with English subtitles in July 1969, with an 86-minute running time. The film was not widely distributed in the United States until it was reissued by Cinevista with English subtitles in February 1985, with an 83-minute running time.

References

Footnotes

Sources

External links
 
 

Films directed by Kinji Fukasaku
1960s Japanese-language films
1968 films
Shochiku films
Cross-dressing in film
Films about kidnapping
Films based on adaptations
Films based on works by Edogawa Ranpo
Films based on works by Yukio Mishima
Films set in Osaka
Films scored by Isao Tomita
Japanese films based on plays
Japanese detective films
1960s Japanese films